Camiel Martinus Petrus Stephanus Eurlings (born 16 September 1973) is a Dutch politician and businessman. A member of the Christian Democratic Appeal (CDA), he served as Minister of Transport, Public Works and Water Management from 2007 to 2010. He is a Member of the supervisory board of Nordica (airline).

A corporate director by occupation, Eurlings was elected as a member of the House of Representatives at the general election of 1998, serving from 19 May 1998 until 20 July 2004, when he was elected as a Member of the European Parliament (MEP) in the European Parliament election of 2004, serving from 20 July 2004 until 22 February 2007. After the general election of 2006, Eurlings was asked to become Minister of Transport, Public Works and Water Management in the Fourth Balkenende cabinet, serving from 22 February 2007 until 14 October 2010.

Eurlings retired from active politics at the age of 37 and became a corporate director and later President and CEO of KLM, serving at the Air France – KLM Group from 15 March 2011 until 16 October 2014. Later he served, amongst others, as Member of the Board of Directors of American Express GBT and currently as Director of Knighthood Capital.

Biography
Eurlings is the eldest son of Martin Eurlings, a former member of the provincial-executive of Limburg, who was elected Mayor of Valkenburg aan de Geul in 2007. 

After grammar school in Maastricht, Eurlings began to study Industrial Engineering at Eindhoven in 1993. He was also politically active in his hometown. On 12 April 1994, at age 20, he was elected councillor of his hometown. This made him the youngest councillor at that time. Eurlings graduated cum laude in 1998. At that moment he already was elected as youngest member of the Netherlands National Parliament (Tweede Kamer der Staten-Generaal).

Politics
Camiel Eurlings was Member of the Netherlands House of Representatives from 1998 until 2004 for the CDA (Christian Democrat Alliance). He was, amongst others, chief spokesman for Transport and for Foreign Affairs.

Eurlings was a former Member of the European Parliamentfrom 2004 until 2007. He sat on the Committee on Foreign Affairs. He also chaired the delegation to the European Union–Russia Parliamentary Cooperation Committee, and was a substitute for the Committee on Civil Liberties, Justice and Home Affairs, the Subcommittee on Human Rights, the Subcommittee on Security and Defence, and the delegation for relations with Israel. He was the European Rapporteur for the Accession of Turkey from 2004 until 2007. 

From March 2006 to March 2007 he served as Vice President of the European People's Party (EPP). From 2007 to 2010 he was the Netherlands Minister of Transport, Public Works and Water Management in the Fourth Balkenende cabinet.

Business career
Eurlings became a corporate director for KLM, in the meantime leading the Cargo department of Air France and KLM. Under his responsibility the commercial integration of Full Freight company Martinair and Air France – KLM Cargo was effectuated.. On 1 July 2013 he succeeded Peter Hartman as the President and CEO of the KLM. 

In 2014, fellow Dutch executives elected Eurlings as 'Best Manager 2014', followed by Frans van Houten (Philips) and Dick Boer (Ahold).

On 15 October 2014, he announced that he would be leaving KLM.

Eurlings served as Member of the Alliance Steering Committee of the Board of Directors of GOL Airlines (Brazil) in 2013 and 2014.

From 2011 until 2014 Eurlings was Member of the executive board of the Netherlands Industry and Employers (VNO-NCW).

In June 2015, Eurlings announced on his LinkedIn page that he had been working as a member of the board of directors of American Express Global Business Travel since January 2015. He resigned from this position in January 2017.

In February 2018, Eurlings started ad advisor to the Board of Directors of Knighthood Capital. In September 2018, he was nominated to become a Director himself.

Sports
Eurlings became an IOC Member at the 125th IOC Session in Buenos Aires in September 2013. He was appointed as the chairman of the IOC Communication Committee.

Assault accusation 
In January 2018, Eurlings resigned from the IOC following an accusation made against him. The accusation was settled out of court without establishment of guilt by the Public Prosecution Service and without admission of guilt by Eurlings. The settlement was entered into the Justicial Registration with a note, which formally is not a criminal record.

Decorations

References

External links
 
Official
  Ir. C.M.P.S. (Camiel) Eurlings Parlement & Politiek

 
 

 
 

1973 births
Living people
Air France–KLM
Christian Democratic Appeal MEPs
Christian Democratic Appeal politicians
Dutch chief executives in the airline industry
Dutch corporate directors
Dutch Roman Catholics
Dutch sports executives and administrators
International Olympic Committee members
Officers of the Order of Orange-Nassau
Knights of the Holy Sepulchre
Eindhoven University of Technology alumni
Members of the House of Representatives (Netherlands)
MEPs for the Netherlands 2004–2009
Ministers of Transport and Water Management of the Netherlands
Municipal councillors in Limburg (Netherlands)
People from Valkenburg aan de Geul
Sint-Maartenscollege (Maastricht) alumni
20th-century Dutch politicians
21st-century Dutch businesspeople
21st-century Dutch politicians